Hadeborn is a river of Saxony-Anhalt, Germany. It flows into the Wipper in Hettstedt.

See also
List of rivers of Saxony-Anhalt

Rivers of Saxony-Anhalt
Rivers of Germany